Acanthotetilla is a genus of demosponges belonging to the family Tetillidae.
They are distinguished from others in the family by the presence of distinctive, heavily spined skeletal structures called "megacanthoxeas".

Species
There are seven species described in the genus: 
 Acanthotetilla celebensis de Voogd & van Soest, 2007 - Found in the Indian Ocean.
 Acanthotetilla enigmatica (Lévi, 1964) - Found in the Indian Ocean.
 Acanthotetilla gorgonosclera van Soest, 1977 - Found in the Atlantic Ocean near Barbados.
 Acanthotetilla hemisphaerica Burton, 1959 - Found in the Indian Ocean.
 Acanthotetilla rocasensis Peixinho, Fernandez, Oliveira, Caires & Hajdu, 2007
 Acanthotetilla seychellensis (Thomas, 1973) - Found in the Indian Ocean.
 Acanthotetilla walteri Peixinho, Fernandez, Oliveira, Caires & Hajdu, 2007

References

Systema Porifera

Spirophorida